The China Democratic League (CDL) is one of the eight legally recognized minor political parties in the People's Republic of China under the Chinese Communist Party's United Front. The CDL was originally founded in 1941 as an umbrella coalition group of the Chinese National Socialist Party, the Chinese Youth Party and the Chinese Peasants' and Workers' Democratic Party to fight the Imperial Japanese Army while providing for a "Third Way".

In 2020, the CDL had around 330,600 members. The CDL is the second-ranking minor party in China after the Revolutionary Committee of the Chinese Kuomintang. Of all such parties it also has the most seats in the Standing Committee of the National People's Congress at 9 seats. However, it has 58 seats in the National People's Congress, 6 less than the Jiusan Society. Its current chairman is Ding Zhongli.

History 
The China Democratic Political League was established in Chongqing on 19 March 1941, and changed its name to the China Democratic League in September 1944. At its formation, it was a coalition of three pro-democracy parties and three pressure groups. Its two main goals were to support China's war effort during the Second Sino-Japanese War and to provide a centrist third option between the Kuomintang and the Chinese Communist Party. Influential members or supporters included Zhang Dongsun, Zhang Junmai (Carson Chang), Luo Longji, Pan Guangdan, Huang Yanpei, Fei Xiaotong, Li Huang of the Young China Party, Wu Han, Chu Anping, and Wen Yiduo.

After the war, many Americans in China were sympathetic to the League. Theodore White wrote that if "the men of the middle group were well organized, they could guarantee peace. But they are not. They lack an army, a political machine, roots in any social class. Only the spread of education and industry can create enough men of the modern world to give them a broad social base."

In October 1945, the League released a report reaffirming its political commitments and outlining its goals. In it, the League declared themselves to be neither left nor right, favoring neither liberal democracy nor socialist democracy. Although the report praised elements of Western liberal democracies, it also criticized the economic inequalities that existed in Western capitalist societies. The report thus concluded that the best form of democracy for China would incorporate elements of both "Western political democracy" and "Soviet economic democracy". To achieve this, the League hoped to work with both the Nationalists and the Communists in a coalition government to write a new constitution. However, disillusionment with the Nationalist government, which outlawed the League in 1947, and infiltration by the Chinese Communist Party (CCP) caused the League to lean towards the CCP during the second phase of the Chinese Civil War. Thereafter, two of its constituent parties, the China National Socialist Party and the Chinese Youth Party, left the League to join the Nationalists in Taiwan. The remaining constituent party left later and eventually became the Chinese Peasants' and Workers' Democratic Party in February 1947.

The three interest groups were the National Salvation Association, the Rural Reconstruction Association, and the Vocational Education Society. The NSA, by far the largest and most popular of the interest groups, was inspired by the National Salvation Armies and existed to encourage resistance against Japan, but became irrelevant after the war's end. The RRA was an agrarianist lobby formed from the Rural Reconstruction Movement, which was originally hostile to communism but their interests in peasant welfare gradually intersected. The third interest group, the Vocational Education Society, wanted to establish vocational schools throughout China and became the core of the China Democratic National Construction Association.

People's Republic of China 
Its chairman Zhang Lan served as the vice chairman of Central People's Government of the People's Republic of China from 1949 to 1954.

In 1997, the League adopted a constitution, which stipulated that its program was "to hold high the banner of patriotism and socialism, implement the basic line for the primary stage of socialism, safeguard stability in the society, strengthen services to national unity and strive for the promotion of socialist modernisation, establishment and improvement of a market economy, enhancement of political restructuring and socialist spiritual civilisation, emancipation and development of productive forces, consolidation and expansion of the united patriotic front and realisation of the grand goals of socialism with Chinese characteristics."

Organization 
According to its constitution, the CDL "holds high the great banner of socialism with Chinese characteristics" and upholds the leadership of the CCP.

The CDL publishes the newspaper Popular Tribune and the Central Communications of the League. Historically, the newspaper published the Guangming Daily.

Composition 
The League is mainly made up of senior intellectuals in the fields of culture, education, natural and social sciences, and technology. As of the end of 2012, the party had a membership of more than 282,000. Of this total, 22.8% were from the field of advanced education, 30.2% were from the field of compulsory education, 17.4% were in science and technology, and 5.8% were in art and the press. By 2020, the party had grown to 330,600 members.

Chairpersons 
The leader of the Party is officially called the Chairperson of the Central Committee of the China Democratic League. Between 19 March 1941 and 19 September 1944, the office was known as the Chairperson of the Central Executive Committee of the China Democratic Political League, which changed to the Chairperson of the Central Executive Committee of the China Democratic League in 19 September, which again changed and assumed its current name in 27 December 1949.

Further reading

References

External links 
 

 
1941 establishments in China
Organizations associated with the Chinese Communist Party
Political parties established in 1941
Progressive parties
Social democratic parties in Asia
Socialist parties in China